Benjamin Kruse (born 4 May 1978 in Hamburg) is a German former professional footballer who played as a defender. He made his debut on the professional league level in the Bundesliga for Hamburger SV on 28 October 2000 when he came on as a substitute in the 63rd minute in a game against SpVgg Unterhaching.

References

1978 births
Living people
German footballers
Association football defenders
FC Eintracht Norderstedt 03 players
Hamburger SV players
Hamburger SV II players
SC Freiburg players
MSV Duisburg players
Bundesliga players
2. Bundesliga players
Footballers from Hamburg